San Ramón is a district of the La Unión canton, in the Cartago province of Costa Rica.

Geography 
San Ramón has an area of  km² and an elevation of  metres.

Demographics 

For the 2011 census, San Ramón had a population of  inhabitants.

Transportation

Road transportation 
The district is covered by the following road routes:
 National Route 202

Economy  
One of its main economic activities is the plantation of cypress, used as Christmas trees in Costa Rica. Along with its immediate neighbors San Rafael District and Mata de Plátano District, it forms one of the main cypress production areas in all the Costa Rican Central Region.

References 

Districts of Cartago Province
Populated places in Cartago Province